Papito (lit. "Daddy") is an album released by Spanish pop singer Miguel Bosé to celebrate his 30 years in the Music industry. The album includes 14 tracks of previously known hit songs by the artist, in reworked versions in collaboration with many artists including Juanes, Shakira, Amaia Montero, Ricky Martin, Laura Pausini, Paulina Rubio, Alaska, Julieta Venegas, Michael Stipe, Bimba Bosé, David Summers, Ivete Sangalo and Italian singer Mina.

Recording 
According to the album booklet, this is the biggest music project ever completed in Spain. To make this album, the recording sessions lasted 10 months, Mr. Bosé had to travel 80,000 km by plane whilst his crew traveled even more: 130,000 km. They used 80 plane tickets, 152 hotel rooms and 38 rental cars, 15,000 phone calls were made and 10,000 e-mails were sent to make this project.

2,977 digital tracks were recorded during 2,234 hours in 19 different studios in eight cities, seven producers were involved, 14 sound engineers, 25 assistants and 87 musicians.

Packaging 
There are two versions of Papito: the standard edition with 15 tracks, and the special edition with another CD containing 15 previously recorded duets with same number of artists.

Awards 
On August 29, 2007, this album received four Latin Grammy nominations for Album of the Year, Record of the Year for "Nena" (his collaboration with Paulina Rubio), Best Pop Vocal Album, Male and Carlos Jean got a nod for his work producing this album, winning none.

Also, on December 6, 2007, Papito was nominated in the Best Latin Pop Album field at the 50th Annual Grammy Awards.

This album also won the Oye award in Mexico for Album of the Year .

Track listing
Disc one
“Morena Mía” featuring Julieta Venegas
“Si Tu No Vuelves” featuring Shakira
“Bambú” featuring Ricky Martin
"Nada particular" featuring Juanes
“Amante Bandido” featuring Alaska
“Sevilla” featuring Amaia Montero former member of La Oreja de Van Gogh
“Nena” featuring Paulina Rubio
“Te amaré” featuring Laura Pausini
“Los chicos no lloran” featuring David Summers
“Como un Lobo” featuring Bimba Bosé
“Olvídame tú” featuring Ivete Sangalo
“Este mundo va” featuring Leonor Watling 4:50
“No Encuentro Un Momento Pa' Olvidar” featuring Sasha Sokol
“Hay días” featuring Alejandro Sanz
“Lo que hay es lo que ves” featuring Michael Stipe

The special edition of Papito includes the songs from above and also:

Disc two
Si Puedo Volverte a Ver (featuring Benny Ibarra)
Encadenados (featuring Chavela Vargas)
Agua y Sal (featuring Mina)
El Sitio de mi Recreo (featuring Antonio Vega)
La Vida es Bella (featuring Noa)
El Verano más Triste (featuring Carlos Berlanga)
Mía (featuring Armando Manzanero)
Habana (featuring Alejandro Fernández)
Corazones (featuring Ana Torroja)
Hojas Secas (featuring Mikel Erentxun)
Manos Vacías (featuring Rafa Sánchez)
Cada día (featuring Hotel Persona)
Carla (featuring David Ascanio)
Donde Alcance el Sol (featuring Pedro Andrea)
Si Todos Fuesen Iguales a Tí (featuring Rosa León)

Charts

Weekly charts

Sales and certifications

Personnel 
 Produced by: Miguel Bosé, Andrés Levin, Carlos Jean, Sandy McLelland and Nicolas Sorín
 Executive producer: José Luis de la Peña
 Additional production : Goodandevil ("Morena Mia", "Nada Particular", "Este Mundo Va", "Los Chicos No Lloran", and "Lo Que Hay es lo que Ves".
 Recorded at: PKO Studios (Madrid), La Cuadra (Madrid), Estudio Jean (Madrid) Estudio Jean Roche (Cádiz), The River (London), Fun Machine (NY), Stratosphere Sound (NY), Sony Music Studios (NY), Goodandevil (NY), Elias Arts (NY), The Sound Lab (NY), Sony Music Studios (NY), Carl Thiel Music (Austin, Texas), Gamson's Place (LA), El Coraje (Miami), The Hit Factory Criteria (Miami) and Dreams Factory Studios (Panama).
 Recorded by: Pepo Sherman, Sandy McLelland, Andres Levin, Carlos Alvarez, Bori Alarcon, Gustavo Celis, Jose Luis Crespo, Goodandevil, Geof Sanoff, Phil Mezzetti, Carl Thiel, Dan Dzula, Robert A. Moses, Carlos Hernández y Miguel Bustamante.
 Mixed at: PKO Studios by Andy Bradfeld
 Assisted by: Carlos Hernández and Melisa Nanni.
 Backing vocals: Helen de Quiroga (“Te Amaré”), Tommy Dena (“Los Chicos No Lloran”) and Bosé (all tracks).
 Design: Daviddelfin/GrandeGraphix
 Graphic design and illustrations: GrandeGraphix

References

External links
 Album Lyrics

2007 albums
Miguel Bosé albums
Warner Records albums
Vocal duet albums